Melatonin receptor 1C, also known as MTNR1C, is a protein that is encoded by the Mtnr1c gene. This receptor has been identified in fish, amphibia, and birds, but not in humans.

References

Further reading

See also 
 Melatonin receptor

G protein-coupled receptors
1C